The women's individual archery event at the 2008 Summer Olympics was part of the archery programme. It took place at the Olympic Green Archery Field. Ranking Round was on 9 August 2008. First and second elimination rounds took place on 12 August, and eights, quarterfinal, semifinals and medals matches were on 14 August. All archery was done at a range of 70 metres, with targets 1.22 metres in diameter.

Park Sung-hyun tried to defend her Olympic Gold Medal won in Athens, along with British Alison Williamson, winner of the bronze medal in 2004.

64 archers from 37 countries qualified for the event at the Beijing Olympics. The 44th Outdoor Archery World championship, held in Leipzig, Germany, plus 5 continental qualification tournaments and a Final World Qualification Tournament selected 61 slots for the event, along with 3 Tripartite Commission Invitations.

The competition began with the ranking round. Each archer fired 72 arrows. This round was done entirely to seed the elimination brackets; all archers moved on to them. The elimination rounds used a single-elimination tournament, with fixed brackets based on the ranking round seeding. In each round of elimination, the two archers in each match fired 12 arrows; the archer with the higher score advanced to the next round while the other archer was eliminated. Unlike in previous years, in which the first three rounds used an 18-arrow match, the 12-arrow match was used throughout the 2008 tournament.

The Chinese archer Zhang Juanjuan defeated South Korean Park Sung-hyun by a margin of 1 point, ending the Koreans' dominance in the women's individual archery event, which dated back to the 1984 Summer Olympics.

Schedule
All times are China Standard Time (UTC+8)

Records
Prior to this competition, the existing world and Olympic records were as follows.
72 arrow ranking round

12 arrow match

The following new world and Olympic records were set during this competition.

Ranking Round

Competition bracket

Section 1

Section 2

Section 3

Section 4

Finals

References

External links 
 FITA
 Results

W
2008 in women's archery
Women's events at the 2008 Summer Olympics